Rhynchosia, also known as snoutbean, is a genus of plants in the family Fabaceae.  There are several different complexes within the genus, including the Senna complex.

Species
Species include:
 Rhynchosia americana 
 Rhynchosia calosperma 
 Rhynchosia caribaea 
 Rhynchosia chapmanii
 Rhynchosia chimanimaniensis
 Rhynchosia cinerea 
 Rhynchosia cytisoides 
 Rhynchosia densiflora 
 Rhynchosia difformis 
 Rhynchosia edulis 
 Rhynchosia latifolia 
 Rhynchosia lewtonii 
 Rhynchosia malacophylla 
 Rhynchosia michauxii 
 Rhynchosia minima 
 Rhynchosia parvifolia 
 Rhynchosia phaseoloides 
 Rhynchosia precatoria  
 Rhynchosia reniformis 
 Rhynchosia reticulata 
 Rhynchosia senna - Texas snoutbean 
 Rhynchosia stipitata
 Rhynchosia sublobata 
 Rhynchosia swartzii 
 Rhynchosia tomentosa 
 Rhynchosia totta 
 Rhynchosia viscosa (Roth) DC.
 Rhynchosia volubilis
 Rhynchosia wildii

Legal status

United States

Louisiana
Except for ornamental purposes, growing, selling or possessing Rhynchosia spp. is prohibited by Louisiana State Act 159.

References 

 
Fabaceae genera